Élodie Fontan (born 9 July 1987) is a French actress. She has appeared in more than fifteen television and film productions since 1996.

Life and career

Élodie Fontan started very young in French commercials for Nissan, Quick and Euro Disney.
She gained notoriety in 2009 by playing Alyzée, Clem's best friend, in the Clem series, broadcast on TF1.
In 2014, she joined the cast of the comedy Serial (Bad) Weddings alongside Chantal Lauby and Christian Clavier.

She is part of La Bande à Fifi, a French comedy troupe bringing together Philippe Lacheau, Élodie Fontan, Tarek Boudali, Reem Kherici and Julien Arruti.

She joined in 2018 the group of Les Enfoirés.

Since 2016, she has been in a relationship with Philippe Lacheau.

Filmography

Feature films

Television

References

External links

 

1987 births
Living people
French film actresses
French television actresses
20th-century French actresses
21st-century French actresses
People from Bondy